Oriel College Boat Club (OCBC) is the rowing club of Oriel College, Oxford. Rowing at Oriel is carried out from the college's own boat-house across Christ Church Meadow, on Boat House Island. 

Oriel has had three general periods, all with occasional interruptions, in which it has been the foremost college as measured by its most senior men's eight in rowing, as competed at in the two intercollegiate bumps races: Torpids and Eights Week (Summer Eights). These are the early 1840s, the 1933 to 1936 period and 1976 to date. It thus holds the most such wins (headships) of any college. The club's women's eight has also twice won ahead of all other colleges since the admission to women to the college – 1986.

Racing 
In men's rowing at short races, bumps, this is the most successful Oxford college boat club. As of 2020, Oriel holds 37 Torpids Headships, by a large margin, the most of any college and 33 Summer Eights Headships.

From 1972 to 1998 Oriel's Men's First Boat was undefeated in Torpids, the longest run of any college by far. In 2006 Oriel claimed the first ever double headship in Torpids, rowing over as Head of the River in both the men's and women's first divisions. In 2018 Oriel repeated this victory with their second double headship. It is the only college to possess a double headship in Torpids.

The women's and men's second boats have long been in "fixed divisions" in the bumps charts and, as such, are guaranteed a place in racing each year. The college usually fields third boats (and sometimes more) for the bumps events. More extensive information on the results of Torpids and Eights can be found here: Oxford Bumps Charts

In addition to the Oxford-based races, Oriel crews compete in external events including the Fairbairn Cup, the Head of the River Race, the Women's Eights Head of the River Race, the Henley Boat Races and many regional and national events.

In 2016 the men's first boat won the men's eights collegiate event at the Fairbairn, it won again in 2017 and won the entire event in 2018.

Colours and Emblems 

The general emblem of the Oriel College Boat Club is the three ostrich feathers, an example of Oriel College's use of the Prince of Wales's feathers. In recent years this has been augmented by the addition of crossed-oars below the feathers. The first boats row under the emblem of the Tortoise Club, detailed below, a tradition established from when OCBC would race at external regattas as The Tortoise Club.  The boat club's colours are the same as the College's: two white stripes on navy.

Oriel Rowing Jackets 
Until 2009 the wearing of Boat Club Jackets (ivory with navy blue piping and cuff rings, bearing the three ostrich feather emblem on the left breast) was limited to the 1st and 2nd Summer VIII's and Torpids and the Oriel College Boat Club Committee. At that time cuff ring designations were: Three rings for 1st Summer VIII and 1st Torpid; two rings for Boat Club Committee; one ring for 2nd Summer VIII 2nd Torpid. These now obsolete designations can still be seen at the Walters of Oxford website.

Changes brought about in the Oriel Blazer Act of 2009 to become more inclusive of lower-boats' alumni (3rd, 4th, and sometimes 5th VIII's as well as boat coxswains) reformed the cuff ring designations as follows: Three rings for 1st Summer VIII; two rings for 1st Torpid and those awarded Tortoise membership at the Tortoise Council's discretion; one ring for general boat club members (no specific distinction for committee members exists today).

Cultural Presence 
In Tom Brown at Oxford by Thomas Hughes, Oriel's win in the 1842 Head of the River Race, with Oriel bumping Trinity, was re-written as Tom's college, "St Ambrose" taking first place and "Oriel" in second place.

Oriel College, in particular the Boat Club Captains' rooms, as well as Oriel memorabilia and references are also present in Oxford Blues (1984) and True Blue (1991).

Oriel Regatta 
During the 7th week in Trinity Term, OCBC hosts the annual Oriel Regatta; events in this competition are Mixed Eights and Crewdate Eights. Mixed Eights are crews from a single college that must contain at least four women rowers. For Crewdate Eights one enters as a group of four rowers with or without a coxswain and are then matched up with another group, where possible creating a mixed college and mixed gender crew. The final two crews have a crewdate paid for them by the Regatta. It is a fun event with which to end the year's collegiate racing schedule. The course runs upstream from the Longbridges Boathouse to past the end of boathouses on Christ Church Island and races are conducted in knock-out format.

Alumni

The Tortoise Club 
The purpose of the Tortoise Club is two-fold: the recognition and celebration of outstanding Oriel rowing; and the financial support of the OCBC. Membership is by election: proposal by the Men's Captain of Boats, Women's Captain of Boats and the President of the Tortoise Club. Election is by the approval of the Tortoise Council.

Members must be Orielenses (excepting Honorary members) who have represented OCBC with excellence. Members of the men's and women's 1st Summer VIII and 1st Torpid are judged to have fulfilled these criteria but still must be approved by the Tortoise Council. All other potential members are at the Council's discretion.

The unique emblem of the Tortoise Club is the tortoise badge. The College of Arms' narrative should not be misunderstood to imply the use of the Tortoise emblem by the general Oriel College Boat Club membership or members of the Oriel Society – these have their own appropriate emblematic devices.

Former clubs

The Blessed Virgins Club 
This was an exclusive, women's alumni club. Since 2016, women are admissible into the Tortoise Club on the same terms as men so the club is defunct. At the creation of the Oriel College Women's Boat Club in 1986, rowers in their 1st VIII and 1st Torpid became members of this club mutatis mutandis to the Tortoise Club. The respective unique emblem was a pair of (angelic) wings. The "Blessèd Virgins" was a nod to a name of the college as still seen in some registers of title and official documents today, The House of Blessèd Mary the Virgin in Oxford.

Noteworthy rowers 
 Anthony Purssell – British rower, Olympian in 1948
Chris Mahoney – British rower, Olympian in 1980 and 1984; President of the OUBC in 1981.
Daniel Lyons – American rower, World Champion in 1986; Olympian in 1988
Terence Dillon – British Rower, Olympian in 1988 and 1992.
Michael Wherley – American rower, three times World Champion, 1997, 1998 and 1999; Olympian in 2000 and 2004; won the 2008 Boat Race (as the oldest rower in the history of the event); and was inducted into the US National Rowing Hall of Fame in 2014.
George Bridgewater – New Zealand rower, Olympian in 2004 and Bronze medallist in the pair at the 2008 Summer Olympics
 Peter Hackworth – British coxswain, cox of the 2002 Blue Boat
 Sjoerd Hamburger – Dutch rower, Olympian in 2008 and 2012
 Chris Mahoney – British rower, Olympic silver medallist in 1980
 Lucas McGee – American rower, USRowing Men's National Team coach
Malcolm Howard – Canadian rower, Olympic  Gold medallist in 2008 and Silver medalist in 2012; 2014 OUBC President
 Pete Reed – British rower, Olympic gold medalist in 2008, 2012 and 2016
 Liam Corrigan - American rower, Olympian in 2020

Captains of Boats

Honours

Henley Royal Regatta

Summer Eights

Torpids

See also
University rowing (UK)
Oxford University Boat Club
Rowing on the River Thames

References

Rowing clubs of the University of Oxford
Oriel College, Oxford
Rowing clubs in Oxfordshire
Rowing clubs of the River Thames
Sport in Oxford
Rowing clubs in England